The Easter Rising centenary parade took place in Dublin city on Easter Sunday, 27 March 2016 to commemorate the centenary of the Easter Rising. It involved all branches of the Defence Forces, including the Army, Air Corps, Naval Service and Reserve Defence Forces, as well as the Garda Síochána, Dublin Fire Brigade, the HSE National Ambulance Service, the Irish Coast Guard, the Irish Prison Service and Customs, the Red Cross, the RNLI, Civil Defence Ireland and St John Ambulance Ireland. The parade was one of the largest of its kind ever held in the state, involving over 3,700 military personnel, 78 vehicles and 17 aircraft. The events were broadcast on RTÉ television and it is estimated that around 1 million people viewed the parade across the streets of Dublin. The parade commenced at 10.30am from St. Stephen's Green and made its way along Dublin before stopping at O'Connell Bridge for the main Easter Sunday Commemoration at the GPO. Following the ceremony, the troops marched past the GPO in O'Connell Street before finishing at Bolton Street around 3pm.

Ceremony
The Easter Rising ceremony was attended by the President of Ireland Michael D Higgins, his wife Sabina Higgins, Taoiseach Enda Kenny, Tánaiste Joan Burton, the Fianna Fáil leader Micheál Martin, the Ceann Comhairle Seán Ó Fearghaíl, the Lord Mayor of Dublin Críona Ní Dhálaigh, the Deputy First Minister of Northern Ireland Martin McGuinness, Former Presidents Mary Robinson and Mary McAleese and Former Taoisigh Liam Cosgrave, John Bruton, Bertie Ahern and Brian Cowen. Other members of the government were also present at the commemoration, as well as a range of religious leaders and military officers. Ahead of the ceremony, the President inspected a guard of honour from the 27th Infantry Battalion from Finner Camp in County Donegal. The centenary commemoration began at 12pm with the lowering of the Flag of Ireland before a short prayer service was held. This was followed by a piper's lament as children from the four provinces of Ulster, Leinster, Munster and Connacht lay daffodils around the pillars of the GPO. The Band of the Army No.1 Brigade then played Danny Boy before the Proclamation of the Irish Republic was read out by a soldier from the Irish Army. After the band played Seán Ó Riada's Mise Éire, the President laid a wreath in front of the GPO in memory of those who were killed during the Rising in April 1916. A minute's silence was observed before the sounding of the Last Post. After the Irish flag was raised on top of the GPO, the Army No.1 Band played the national anthem, Amhrán na bhFiann while a flypast of 6 Pilatus PC-9 aircraft from the Irish Air Corps flew across the GPO to conclude the commemoration ceremony.

Full order of the 2016 Easter Rising centenary parade

Bands
Irish Defence Forces School of Music
The Army No.1 Band
The Band of the (2nd) Southern Brigade
The Band of the (4th) Western Brigade
The Pipe Band of the Defence Forces
The Garda Band
The Dublin Fire Brigade Pipe Band
The Irish Prison Service Pipe Band
The Irish Ambulance Service Pipe Band

Weapons
Steyr AUG - assault rifle
FN MAG - 7.62 mm machine gun
M2 Browning - 12.7 mm machine gun
L118 light gun - 105 mm towed howitzer
L119 light gun - 105 mm towed howitzer

Vehicles

Active
Mowag Piranha IIIH - armoured personnel carrier
RG-32M Light Tactical Vehicle (LTV) - MRAP armoured personnel carrier
FV101 Scorpion - reconnaissance vehicle/light tank 
Ford F350 SRV - reconnaissance vehicle
Scania R 420 6x6 - troop carrying vehicle 
Bandvagn 206 - Air defence support vehicle

Retired
Ford Mk VI - armoured car
Sisu Pasi - armoured personnel carrier
Panhard M3 - armoured personnel carrier
AML-90 - armoured car
AML-20 - armoured car

Aircraft
Pilatus PC-9 - trainer/light attack aircraft
CN235-100 - transport aircraft/maritime patrol aircraft
Learjet 45 - VIP transport
AgustaWestland AW139 - utility helicopter
Eurocopter EC135 - utility helicopter

Gallery

See also
 1916 Centenary Commemorative Medal
Centenary of the Easter Rising
Semicentennial of the Easter Rising

References

2016 in the Republic of Ireland
Parade
Military parades
Parades in Ireland
March 2016 events in Ireland